Yerramalla is a village in the West Godavari district of Andhra Pradesh, India. It comes under assembly constituency Unguturu and Eluru Parliamentary constituency.

Villages in West Godavari district